Radin Inten II International Airport (formerly WICT) is an airport that serves the city of Bandar Lampung in Lampung, Indonesia. The name is taken from Radin Inten II (1834–1858), the last Sultan of Lampung (possibly a vassal of the Banten Sultanate). It is on the Jalan Branti Raya in Branti, Natar, northwest of Bandar Lampung in the South Lampung regency. The airport serves the Lampung area, as it is currently the only commercial airport in the Lampung province. Radin Inten II Airport in Lampung Province is a public airport organized by PT Angkasa Pura II.

The Lampung Provincial Government currently continues to work to accelerate the status change Radin Inten II Airport Branti Lampung became an international airport. This status upgrading is necessary because the Lampung Provincial Government targets during the 2018 haj season, the status of Radin Inten II Airport changed from the hajj embarkation airport between being a full hajj embarkation. Thus, starting 2018, pilgrims from Lampung can fly directly from Lampung to Mecca.

Radin Inten II Bandar Lampung Airport is officially designated as an international standard airport. The decision of Radin Inten II Airport as an international airport was in accordance with the decision of the Minister of Transportation Budi Karya Sumadi.

The Decree of the Minister of Transportation of the Republic of Indonesia Number KP 2044 of 2018 concerning the Determination of Radin Inten Airport in South Lampung Regency, Lampung Province as an International Airport.

History 
Formerly called Branti Airport, the airport was built by the Japanese in 1942 on the midst of World War II to combat the Allied forces. It serves as a home base of several Japanese airplanes and warplanes. After Indonesia declared independence, the airport was taken over by the Indonesian Air Force. At that time, the airport still have not served any commercial planes. In 1963, Branti Airport was handed over from Air Force to the Lampung Residency.

In 1976 the construction of the runway and the apron was completed, and it was inaugurated in June 1976 using the Fokker-28 MK-3000 aircraft. From 1984 to 1987 the runway was extended 330 meters to the extent of which the runway reached 1,850 meters. On May 22, 1995, a new terminal was completed and inaugurated by Minister of Transport Haryanto Dhanutirto. The name of Branti Airport was changed to Radin Inten II Airport.

Airlines and destinations

Airport Services Tax 
Taxes Domestic: Rp 25,000
Taxes International: Rp 100,000

Hajj 
Radin Inten II Lampung also had six consecutive years between the airport of hajj embarkation since 2010 until now by quotas for the number of pilgrims who dispatched as many as 6,282 person per year, while for pilgrims Lampung that waiting lists are currently more than 80 thousand people. The waiting time for the pilgrims for their turn to go Hajj is approximately 16 years of waiting.

Expansion 
Lampung Provincial Government and DGCA Ministry of Transport since June 2012 has signed the MoU on the development and construction Radin Inten II Airport Lampung.

MoU numbered G/454/III.06/HK/2012 and HK.201/1/14/DRJU-2012 was used as the basis of the two sides to develop the largest airports in the province of Lampung has become an international airport. The target, the plan was completed in 2017.

Currently Radin Inten II is under renovation. The building belongs to the local government or lobby which has narrowed the parking lot finally dismantled. It is estimated that before the end of January 2016, parking lot in the wider region and able to carry 400 vehicles.

In 2016, the airport terminal was increased to three floors are projected to contain more than 3 million passengers with a four-storey parking building so it can accommodate 1000 vehicles. In addition, according to the plan the Ministry of Transportation, the runway was extended to 3,000 meters from the previous 2,500 meters.

Land Transportation

Taxi 
Usually there are taxi there until the last flight . and Corporate Services providers Taxi Namely :
 Puspa Jaya Taxi

Bus Rapid Transit (BRT) 
 Trans Lampung

Train 
To support the development of Radin Inten II Airport as an international airport in 2017, the Ministry of Transport will also build a railway line Tanjung Karang - Radin Inten II Branti South Lampung to unravel congestion and better organize transport modes.

See also

List of airports in Indonesia

References

External links

Airports in Sumatra
Buildings and structures in Lampung
Transport in Lampung
Lampung